Table Cape is a extinct volcano located near Wynyard on the North West of Tasmania, Australia, it is also the name of the locality which encompasses the geological feature. It was named by British navigator, Matthew Flinders, as he and George Bass circumnavigated Van Diemen's Land (now Tasmania) in 1798 upon the Norfolk. Flinders also progressively named the nearby Circular Head, Three Hummock and Hunter Islands.

Table Cape's top and surrounding areas are composed of fertile basalt soils and are heavily cultivated, the area is renowned for the annual flowering of tulips during spring and accompanying tulip festival. The 2011 census determined a population of 324 for the state suburb of Flowerdale, which the locality of Table Cape forms part of.

Landscape and conservation
Whilst the top of Table Cape and surrounding district is heavily utilised for agriculture, the steep and rocky ocean-facing embankments remain largely undisturbed from human activity and are covered in dense scrubland. The 1.26 km2 Table Cape Conservation Area (IUCN IV) extends along the shoreline from Boat Harbour Beach to the Table Cape State Reserve (IUCN III) before continuing along to Freestone Cove near Fossil Bluff.

Beddomeia capensis is an endangered freshwater snail known only to occur along four small streams on Table Cape, and a tributary of Big Creek near Calder. Population declines are due to habitat degradation from agricultural land usage and competition from other introduced hydrobiid snails.

Tommeginer Aboriginal clan
The territory of the Tommeginer clan of Aboriginal Tasmanians is located around the Table Cape region. The tribe most likely built the stone tidal fish traps that remain evident at nearby Freestone Cove.

Table Cape Lighthouse
Table Cape Lighthouse is a Tasmanian heritage-listed lighthouse situated on the 120 hectare Table Cape State Reserve. It has been open for public tours since 2010.

After the wrecks of the Emma Prescott in 1867 and the schooner Orson in 1884, a lighthouse was commissioned to be constructed on Table Cape to aide navigation into the port of Wynyard on the Inglis River. Table Cape Lighthouse was designed by Huckson and Hutchinson of Hobart, the light apparatus was sourced from the Chance Brothers of England and was constructed by a local builder, John Luck. The project suffered from delays due to poor quality roads leading up to the construction site on Table Cape, and bricks of insufficient quality sourced from the specially-constructed kiln in the nearby town of Burnie, instead, bricks had to be imported from Victoria.

Seventeen days after the official opening, the head lighthouse keeper's 14-month-old son died from illness. The undertaker, who had travelled up to the lighthouse with a coffin for the child, encouraged the family to perform the burial nearby due to the appalling weather conditions at the time. The small gravesite remains to be found nearby today.

Originally powered by oil, Table Cape Lighthouse was converted to automatic acetylene operation in 1920. In 1923, the lightkeepers were withdrawn from manning the tower, and after several years of deterioration, the nearby keepers' cottages were demolished in 1926.

Gallery

See also

 Protected areas of Tasmania
 List of lighthouses in Australia

External links

 Table Cape Tulip Farm
 Table Cape Lighthouse Tours

References

Localities of Waratah–Wynyard Council
Nature reserves in Tasmania
Volcanic plugs of Tasmania
Lighthouses in Tasmania
Lighthouses completed in 1888
Tasmanian Heritage Register